The .17 CCM (Cooper Centerfire Magnum) is a cartridge. It is a necked down version of the .22 CCM.  This cartridge was introduced in 1992 and was originally designed by Mike Hill.  Dan Cooper (President of Cooper Arms) further refined the cartridge and chambering to put it into production in the Cooper Model 38 action.

The .17 CCM is designed specifically for varmint and small game hunting.  Its major benefits are low noise, accuracy and minimal barrel temperature, which makes it a perfect cartridge for prairie dogs.  It has an effective range of around 300 yards, but like any other .17 caliber it is sensitive to the wind out past 100 yards.

See also
 List of rifle cartridges
 4 mm caliber

References

Pistol and rifle cartridges